Maine Goals is a Philippine travel and lifestyle show broadcast by BuKo channel. It is hosted by Maine Mendoza. It premiered on August 2, 2021. Maine Goals featured different places in the country and discover tourist spots and the culture of the locals.

References

2021 Philippine television series debuts